The Sandstorm report is the name of the secret report submitted on June 24, 1991 by financial consultants Price Waterhouse to the Bank of England, showing that the Bank of Credit and Commerce International (BCCI) had engaged in widespread fraud, and that organizations regarded as terrorist groups had maintained several accounts in BCCI in London, with the apparent knowledge of the British and American intelligence community. Sandstorm was Price Waterhouse's codename for BCCI.

As a result of the information contained in the Sandstorm report, the bank was raided and taken over by regulators in seven countries on July 5, 1991. Estimates of financial losses range from $10 billion to $17 billion, though some of it has been recovered by the bank's liquidators, Deloitte & Touche.

See also
 Agha Hasan Abedi
 Bank of Credit and Commerce International
 Abbas Gokal
 Abu Nidal
 The International (2009 film)

References
Full report, part 1 with sections censored by the UK government highlighted with red boxes
Full report, part 2
Kochan, Nick & Whittington, Bob. Bankrupt: The BCCI Fraud, London 1991
Adams, James Ring & Frantz, Douglas. A Full Service Bank, London 1991
"Case study: Bank of Credit and Commerce International", Erisk, June 2001, (via Internet Archive), retrieved October 1, 2007,
An incomplete copy of the Sandstorm report(pdf), made available by the Association for Accountancy and Business Affairs, retrieved November 9, 2005
List of BCCI reports, Association of Accountancy and Business Affairs, retrieved November 9, 2005

Business ethics cases